Prospero Colonna (1662–1743) was a Roman Catholic cardinal. He is also known as Prospero II Colonna to differentiate him from his elder relative cardinal Prospero I Colonna (1410–1463).

Biography
Prospero Colonna was born on 27 Nov 1662 in the Castle di Marino, Marino, Lazio near Rome, the second child of Filippo Colonna and Cleria Cesarini.

References

1662 births
1743 deaths
18th-century Italian cardinals
Colonna family
People from Marino, Lazio